Boron trichloride is the inorganic compound with the formula BCl3. This colorless gas is a reagent in organic synthesis. It is highly reactive toward water.

Production and structure
Boron reacts with halogens to give the corresponding trihalides. Boron trichloride is, however, produced industrially by direct chlorination of boron oxide and carbon at 501 °C.
B2O3 + 3 C + 3 Cl2 → 2 BCl3 + 3 CO
The carbothermic reaction is analogous to the Kroll process for the conversion of titanium dioxide to titanium tetrachloride. In the laboratory BF3 reacted with AlCl3 gives BCl3 via halogen exchange. BCl3 is a trigonal planar molecule like the other boron trihalides, and has a bond length of 175pm.

A degree of π-bonding has been proposed to explain the short B− Cl distance although there is some debate as to its extent. It does not dimerize, although NMR studies of mixtures of boron trihalides shows the presence of mixed halides. The absence of dimerisation contrasts with the tendencies of AlCl3 and GaCl3, which form dimers or polymers with 4 or 6 coordinate metal centres.

Reactions
BCl3 hydrolyzes readily to give hydrochloric acid and boric acid:
BCl3  +  3 H2O   →   B(OH)3  +  3 HCl
Alcohols behave analogously giving the borate esters, e.g. trimethyl borate.

As a strong Lewis acid, BCl3 forms adducts with tertiary amines, phosphines, ethers, thioethers, and halide ions. Adduct formation is often accompanied by an increase in B-Cl bond length. BCl3•S(CH3)2 (CAS# 5523-19-3) is often employed as a conveniently handled source of BCl3 because this solid (m.p. 88-90 °C) releases BCl3:
(CH3)2S·BCl3   ⇌   (CH3)2S  +  BCl3

The mixed aryl and alkyl boron chlorides are also of known. Phenylboron dichloride is commercially available. Such species can be prepared by the redistribution reaction of BCl3 with organotin reagents:
2 BCl3  +  R4Sn   → 2   RBCl2 + R2SnCl2

Reduction
Reduction of BCl3 to elemental boron is conducted commercially in the laboratory, when boron trichloride can be converted to diboron tetrachloride by heating with copper metal: 
2 BCl3  + 2 Cu   →   B2Cl4  +  2 CuCl
B4Cl4 can also be prepared in this way. Colourless diboron tetrachloride (m.p. -93 °C) is a planar molecule in the solid, (similar to dinitrogen tetroxide, but in the gas phase the structure is staggered. It decomposes (disproportionates) at room temperatures to give a series of monochlorides having the general formula (BCl)n, in which n may be 8, 9, 10, or 11.
n B2Cl4   →   BnCln  +  n BCl3
The compounds with formulas B8Cl8 and B9Cl9 are known to contain closed cages of boron atoms.

Uses
Boron trichloride is a starting material for the production of elemental boron. It is also used in the refining of aluminium, magnesium, zinc, and copper alloys to remove nitrides, carbides, and oxides from molten metal. It has been used as a soldering flux for alloys of aluminium, iron, zinc, tungsten, and monel. Aluminum castings can be improved by treating the melt with boron trichloride vapors. In the manufacture of electrical resistors, a uniform and lasting adhesive carbon film can be put over a ceramic base using BCl3. It has been used in the field of high energy fuels and rocket propellants as a source of boron to raise BTU value. BCl3 is also used in plasma etching in semiconductor manufacturing. This gas etches metal oxides by formation of a volatile BOClx and MxOyClz compounds.

BCl3 is used as a reagent in the synthesis of organic compounds. Like the corresponding bromide, it cleaves C-O bonds in ethers.

Safety
BCl3 is an aggressive reagent that can form hydrogen chloride upon exposure to moisture or alcohols. The dimethyl sulfide adduct (BCl3SMe2), which is a solid, is much safer to use, when possible, but H2O will destroy the BCl3 portion while leaving dimethyl sulfide in solution.

See also
List of highly toxic gases

References

Notes

Further reading

External links
 

Boron compounds
Chlorides
Boron halides